The longnose stonebasher (Gnathonemus longibarbis) is a species of fish in the family Mormyridae. It is found in Burundi, the Democratic Republic of the Congo, Kenya, and Tanzania. Its natural habitats are rivers, freshwater lakes, freshwater marshes, and inland deltas.

Diet
The longnose stonebasher has been found to feed on the bottom of water sources amongst minimal vegetation. The fish mainly eats insects such as larvae but has also been known to eat a variety of arthropods, fish eggs and worms.

References

Mormyridae
Taxonomy articles created by Polbot
Taxa named by Franz Martin Hilgendorf
Fish described in 1888